Phoenix Object Basic (formerly known as Envelop) is an object-oriented rapid application development tool for Microsoft Windows and Linux. It has object-oriented features such as inheritance and polymorphism as found in languages such as Python and Perl. It also features a similar design environment and compatible syntax to Visual Basic reducing the learning curve for those making a transition from that language to Linux programming. Phoenix includes a full implementation of the BASIC programming language. It was released for download in 2001 and the Linux package is at version 1.5 beta 6 (released October 2004), it also requires the distribution of a small number of runtime library files with complied applications.

Phoenix Object Basic is a proprietary tool for cross-platform Linux and Windows application development.

Key attributes:

 No longer being actively developed
 Rapid Application Development for Windows and Linux
 Short learning curve for VB developers 
 Object-oriented
 Small executables, Fast execution 
 Cross platform 
 Released as an EXE and RPM file

The Phoenix source code is not available because it contains proprietary third party components. Phoenix is free of charge and freely distributable.

See also 
 HBasic
 Gambas
 REALbasic

References

BASIC programming language family
Discontinued BASICs
Linux integrated development environments